Ed Harrison was an American Negro league infielder in the 1910s.

Harrison played for the West Baden Sprudels in 1914 and 1915. In 20 recorded games for the Sprudels, he posted nine hits and five RBI in 76 plate appearances. He also played for Bowser's ABCs and Jewell's ABCs.

References

External links
 and Seamheads

Year of birth missing
Year of death missing
Place of birth missing
Place of death missing
West Baden Sprudels players